Okamejei is a genus of small skates in the family Rajidae from the central and western Indo-Pacific, and the north-western Pacific Ocean.

Species
Three species formerly placed in this genus were moved to Orbiraja in 2016. There are currently 14 recognized species in Okamejei:
 Okamejei acutispina (Ishiyama, 1958) (Sharpspine skate)
 Okamejei arafurensis Last & Gledhill, 2008 (Arafura skate)
 Okamejei boesemani (Ishihara, 1987) (Boeseman's skate)
 Okamejei cairae Last, Fahmi & Ishihara, 2010 (Borneo sand skate)
 Okamejei heemstrai (McEachran & Fechhelm, 1982) (East African skate)
 Okamejei hollandi (D. S. Jordan & R. E. Richardson, 1909) (Yellow-spotted skate)
 Okamejei kenojei (J. P. Müller & Henle, 1841) (Ocellate spot skate)
 Okamejei leptoura Last & Gledhill, 2008 (Thin-tail skate)
 Okamejei meerdervoortii (Bleeker, 1860) (Bigeye skate)
 Okamejei mengae Jeong, Nakabo & H. L. Wu, 2007
 Okamejei ornata Weigmann, Stehmann & Thiel, 2015 (Ornate skate)
 Okamejei pita (R. Fricke & Al-Hassan, 1995) (Pita skate) (incertae sedis)
 Okamejei schmidti (Ishiyama, 1958) (Browneye skate)
 Okamejei panayensis Misawa, Babaran & Motomura, 2022

References

Rajiformes
Ray genera